Wang Yanlin (born 28 July 1989), also known as Ian Wang, is a Chinese actor.  He is best known for his works in Wu Xin: The Monster Killer (2015), The Starry Night, The Starry Sea (2017). He also starred in the film Operation Red Sea (2018) and The Rescue (2020 film). In 2019, he became a cast member of the popular variety program, Keep Running, for the new season.

Early life
Wang was born on 28 July 1989, and attended Shanghai Theatre Academy.

Personal life
On Chinese valentines, 20 May 2021, he announced his marriage with college classmate Ai Jiani.

Career

Career beginnings
In 2011, Wang was picked by director Chen Mingzhang, who cast him in the television series, My Splendid Life’

In 2013, he was cast in the romance drama Remembering Lichuan. 

In 2014, Wang starred in two television series produced by Tangren Media; the sports romance drama Go! Goal! Fighting! and the historical fantasy drama The Legend of Qin.

2015–present: Rising popularity
Wang's breakout came in 2015, with his appearance in popular period dramas Wu Xin: The Monster Killer and Lady and Liar. 

Wang made his film debut with a cameo appearance in the crime caper film Chongqing Hot Pot. 

In 2017, he starred in fantasy drama The Starry Night, The Starry Sea based on the novel of the same name by Tong Hua. The same year, he starred in the historical action drama Princess Agents and gained recognition with his portrayal of the antagonist character Yuwen Huai. 

In 2018, Wang starred in the war action film Operation Red Sea, receiving positive reviews for his performance. The same year, he starred in his first lead role in the comedy action web series The Big Bug.

In 2019, it was announced that Wang has joined the cast of variety program Keep Running. The same year, he was cast in the action film The Rescue, reuniting with Operation Red Sea director Dante Lam.

In 2020, he was cast in You Are My Glory'' alongside Yang Yang and Dilraba Dilmurat.

Discography

Singles

Filmography

Film

Television series

Television shows

References

External links
 Wang Yanlin on Sina Weibo

1989 births
Living people
People from Anshan
Chinese male stage actors
Male actors from Liaoning
21st-century Chinese male actors
Chinese male film actors
Chinese male television actors
Shanghai Theatre Academy alumni